Ectasjapyx is a genus of diplurans in the family Parajapygidae.

Species
 Ectasjapyx bolivari Silvestri, 1929
 Ectasjapyx machadoi Pagés, 1952
 Ectasjapyx microdontus Pagés, 1952
 Ectasjapyx simulator Pagés, 1952
 Ectasjapyx vilhenai Pagés, 1952

References

Diplura